Bootleg: From the Lost Vault, Vol. 1 is the second compilation album by Esham, released on March 28, 2000.

Reception
Allmusic reviewer Jason Birchmeier wrote that "Bootleg [...] [is] by no means a definitive roundup, but it makes for an adequate introduction to his music."

Track listing

References

2000 greatest hits albums
Albums produced by Esham
Esham compilation albums
Reel Life Productions compilation albums